Uchee Creek is a stream in the U.S. state of Alabama.

Uchee Creek derives its name from the Yuchi (or Uchee) Indians.

References

Alabama placenames of Native American origin
Rivers of Alabama
Rivers of Lee County, Alabama
Rivers of Russell County, Alabama